Thalassotalea insulae is a Gram-negative, aerobic, rod-shaped and motile bacterium from the genus of Thalassotalea which has been isolated from tidal flat sediments from Jindo in Korea.

References

Alteromonadales
Bacteria described in 2018